Skule Bårdsson or Duke Skule (Norwegian: Hertug Skule) (Old Norse: Skúli Bárðarson) ( – 24 May 1240) was a Norwegian nobleman and claimant to the royal throne against his son-in-law, King Haakon Haakonsson. Henrik Ibsen's play Kongs-Emnerne (1863) is about the dispute between Duke Skule and King Haakon.

Biography
Skule Bårdsson was born around 1189. As a son of Bård Guttormsson, he  belonged to the Norwegian nobility and was a half-brother of King Inge Bårdsson who in his last years elevated Skule to be an earl (jarl). After King Inge's death in 1217, Haakon was chosen king at the age of 13, against the candidacy of Skule Bårdsson.  However, Skule held much of the real power under a form of power sharing between Skule and Haakon. Skule's center of power was mostly in Nidaros. He had noblemen who were handbound to him (his vassals/liegemen) such as Endrid Bookling, and Alf of Leifa-steads. These men would probably be somewhere between European count and high Ministerialis. In order to facilitate a compromise between these two rivals, Skule's elder daughter Margaret Skulesdatter was  married to King Haakon in 1225.

Skule thought he had too little of the power and intermittently participated in opposition against King Haakon.  In 1237, as another attempt of compromise, Skule was given the first Norwegian title of duke (hertug). Later, Skule restarted his rebellion against King Haakon. Among others, the Icelander writer Snorre Sturlason allied with Skule in the conflict, and the rebellion led to his death. Skule got into a personal confrontation with Arnbjorn Jonsson over the Borg Stewardship but eventually Arnbjorn yielded his claim to the stewardship because Abbot Bjorn showed him that the king had indeed granted Skule the stewardship. 

Skule allowed his supporters to proclaim him king of Norway at the traditional Thing (Øyrating) in Trøndelag during 1239. Skule also tried, unsuccessfully, to win his other son-in-law, jarl Knut Haakonsson, to his side. He raised a military host against King Haakon  and won a battle at Låka in Nannestad, but lost in Oslo. His party was called the Vårbelgs, a reference to spring pelts of bad quality fur for poor people. In May 1240, Skule was defeated by King Haakon and his supporters. He sought refuge in Elgeseter Priory in Nidaros but Haakon's men burned down the monastery and killed Skule. With Skule’s death, the civil war era came to an end.

Historical context

Skule's rivalry for kingship was the last phase of the civil wars period of Norwegian history, which lasted from around 1130 to 1240. During that long warring period there were several interlocked conflicts of varying scale and intensity. Norway was accustomed to royal sons fighting each other in order to wrest kingship to himself. The background for these conflicts were the unclear Norwegian succession laws, social conditions and the struggle between Church and King. There were then two main parties, firstly known by varying names or no names at all, but finally condensed into parties of Bagler and Birkebeiner.

Sources
The main sources of Sigurd's biography is a poem in  Hryggjarstykki. This was incorporated into Morkinskinna and was used by Snorri Sturlasson when he wrote about Sigurd Slembe  in Heimskringla. Another important source is Orkneyinga saga.

References

Other sources
 Bjørgo, Narve "Skule Bårdsson" in: Norsk biografisk leksikon
 Finlay, Alison editor and translator Fagrskinna, a Catalogue of the Kings of Norway (Brill Academic. 2004)
 Hammer, K. V. "Skule Baardssön" in: Nordisk familjebok Bd. 25. Stockholm 1817. pp. 1238–1239.
Gjerset, Knut History of the Norwegian People  (The MacMillan Company, Volume I,  1915)
Helle, Knut Under kirke og kongemakt, 1130-1350 (Aschehougs Norges historie, Oslo: 1995)
Holmsen,  Andreas Norges historie, fra de eldste tider til 1660 (Oslo: 1961)
Røsoch, Henry  Trondheim's History (Trondheim:  F. Bruns Bokhandel. 1939)
 Øverland, O. A.; Bull, Edvard "Skule Baardssøn" in: Salmonsens konversationsleksikon Bd. 21. Kopenhagen 1926. S. 680.

1180s births
1240 deaths
Norwegian civil wars
Norwegian dukes
Norwegian earls
Burials at Nidaros Cathedral
Pretenders to the Norwegian throne
Assassinated nobility
House of Gille
13th-century Norwegian nobility